Blimaw is a Karenic language of Myanmar.

A word list is available in Shintani (2017).

Classification

Blimaw is classified within the Western Bwe subgroup by Luangthongkum (2019), and is hence closely related to Bwe and Geba. Like Geba, Blimaw preserves the implosives or preglottalised obstruents ɓ/ʔb and ɗ/ʔd, as well as voiceless sonorants such as hn/n̥, hl/l̥, and so forth (see Proto-Karenic language).

References

Karenic languages